Thomas Brian Price, known as Tom Price (born 1945), is a Texas lawyer who served as a judge of the Texas Court of Criminal Appeals from 1996 to 2015. 

Born in Des Moines, Iowa, Price came to Texas as a child, graduated from Highland Park High School in University Park, Texas, and served in the United States Marine Corps early in the Vietnam War. He received his undergraduate degree from East Texas State University, and his Juris Doctor degree from Baylor University Law School in 1970.

References

 

1945 births
Living people
Texas lawyers
Judges of the Texas Court of Criminal Appeals
Texas Republicans
Highland Park High School (University Park, Texas) alumni
Texas A&M University–Commerce alumni
Baylor University alumni
Politicians from Des Moines, Iowa
Lawyers from Dallas
United States Marines